William Mershon Lanning (January 1, 1849 – February 16, 1912) was an American lawyer, jurist, and Republican Party politician who represented  in the United States House of Representatives from 1903 to 1904. He later served as a United States district judge of the United States District Court for the District of New Jersey and as a United States Circuit Judge of the United States Court of Appeals for the Third Circuit and the United States Circuit Courts for the Third Circuit.

Education and career

Born in Ewingville, Ewing Township, Mercer County, New Jersey, Lanning graduated from the Lawrenceville School in 1866. He was employed as a teacher in the public schools of Mercer County and in the Trenton Academy from 1866 to 1880. He read law, was admitted to the bar in 1880 and commenced practice in Trenton, New Jersey. Lanning was elected city solicitor for Trenton in 1884. He was appointed judge of the city district court in 1887 and served until 1891, when legislated out of office. He served as member of a commission to frame township laws and of the constitutional commission of 1894. He served as President of the Mechanics' National Bank of Trenton in 1899.

Congressional service

Lanning was elected as a Republican to the United States House of Representatives of the 58th United States Congress and served from March 4, 1903, to June 6, 1904, when he resigned to accept a federal judicial appointment.

Federal judicial service

Lanning received a recess appointment from President Theodore Roosevelt on June 1, 1904, to a seat on the United States District Court for the District of New Jersey vacated by Judge Andrew Kirkpatrick. He was nominated to the same position by President Roosevelt on December 6, 1904. He was confirmed by the United States Senate on December 13, 1904, and received his commission the same day. His service terminated on May 24, 1909, due to his elevation to the Third Circuit.

Lanning was nominated by President William Howard Taft on May 6, 1909, to a joint seat on the United States Court of Appeals for the Third Circuit and the United States Circuit Courts for the Third Circuit vacated by Judge George M. Dallas. He was confirmed by the Senate on May 18, 1909, and received his commission the same day. On December 31, 1911, the Circuit Courts were abolished and he thereafter served only on the Court of Appeals. His service terminated on February 16, 1912, due to his death in Trenton. He was interred in Presbyterian Cemetery in Ewing Township.

Honor

An elementary school built on Pennington Road (NJ 31) in Ewing in 1914 was named in Lanning's honor. The school was closed and the building sold to a private institution in the mid-1990s, but as of 2014, is still standing and continues to bear Lanning's name.

References

External links

William Mershon Lanning at The Political Graveyard

1849 births
1912 deaths
People from Ewing Township, New Jersey
Politicians from Trenton, New Jersey
New Jersey lawyers
Judges of the United States District Court for the District of New Jersey
United States district court judges appointed by Theodore Roosevelt
20th-century American judges
United States court of appeals judges appointed by William Howard Taft
Judges of the United States Court of Appeals for the Third Circuit
Burials in New Jersey
Republican Party members of the United States House of Representatives from New Jersey
Lawrenceville School alumni
19th-century American politicians